New Haven 600 is a series of pump-action shotguns manufactured by O.F. Mossberg & Sons on behalf of department stores, most notably the Montgomery Ward Company, Western Auto, and other retail stores.  New Haven is one of O.F. Mossberg & Sons' private, promotional brands.  The New Haven 600 is identical to the Mossberg 500 from O.F. Mossberg & Sons, with the addition of an anti-rattle system in the magazine tube, and the top of the receiver is not drilled out of a scope mount. Many of the 600AT models came with adjustable C-Lect Chokes. The 600 series comprises widely varying models of hammerless, pump action repeaters, all of which share the same basic receiver and action, but differ in bore size, barrel length, choke options, magazine capacity, and "furniture" (stock and forearm) materials.

Model numbers
600AT = 12 gauge
600AST= 12 gauge slug barrel iron sights
600BT = 16 gauge
600CT = 20 gauge
600ET = .410 bore

See also
Mossberg 500
O.F. Mossberg & Sons
Pump-action shotgun

External links
Mossberg corporate website.
Manuals in PDF format for the 500.
Maverick Arms corporate website, a subsidiary of Mossberg.

Weapons and ammunition introduced in 1977
O.F. Mossberg & Sons
Pump-action shotguns